Winters Run is a  river in Harford County, Maryland. The dam and reservoir were built by the U.S. Army in 1942 to provide an auxiliary fresh water source for nearby Edgewood Arsenal. Upon reaching the tidal line, the river is renamed Otter Point Creek, which empties to Bush River and the Chesapeake Bay.

North of the dam is Harford Glen, an environmental study area owned by the Harford County Public Schools to provide environmental education to students around the county.

Recreational features
Winters Run contains areas of whitewater Class I and II as well ample fishing opportunities.

See also
List of Maryland rivers

References

 Harford County DPW. "Bush River Basin." Accessed 2010-06-022.
 United States Geological Survey. Reston, VA. "Winters Run." Geographic Names Information System (GNIS). Accessed 2009-09-03.

Rivers of Harford County, Maryland
Tributaries of the Chesapeake Bay
Rivers of Maryland